Delias hippodamia is a butterfly in the family Pieridae. It was described by Alfred Russel Wallace in 1867. It is endemic to Aru.

The wingspan is about 68 mm. Adults are very similar to Delias biaka.

References

External links
Delias at Markku Savela's Lepidoptera and Some Other Life Forms

hippodamia
Butterflies described in 1867
Taxa named by Alfred Russel Wallace
Butterflies of Indonesia